The Cook County Administration Building (formerly known as the Brunswick Building) is a skyscraper located at 69 West Washington Street in Chicago, Illinois. The building, constructed between the years 1962 and 1964, is 475 ft (144.8 m) tall, and contains 35 floors. It has a concrete structure. The building, engineered by Fazlur Khan of the firm Skidmore, Owings & Merrill, is notable for innovating the tube-within-a-tube structural system.

Originally a corporate office building, the tower was later acquired by the Cook County government and now holds government offices and courtrooms.

Design and construction
The building, was constructed between the years 1962 and 1964, and utilizes a concrete structure. At the time of its construction, it was Chicago's tallest concrete office building. The building is designed with an exposed structure and adheres to the modernist architecture style. The building utilizes a deep foundation system.

For this building, engineer Fazlur Khan of the firm Skidmore, Owings & Merrill adapted the tube system he had innovated with the design of The Plaza on DeWitt by creating a tube-within-a-tube, with both the building's core and its perimeter being hollow and rigid tubes that support the tower, allowing for column-free interior space.

At its lower portion, the façade of the tower juts back slightly in a curve.

The building is connected to the Chicago Pedway system, with the Pedway featuring retail spaces in the area where it passes beneath the tower. An underground Chicago Pedway passage connects the building to the Richard J. Daley Center across the street.

The building has a small plaza featuring an untitled sculpture by Joan Miró.

Fire
The Cook County Administration Building saw a structural fire occur on the 12th floor of the building on October 17, 2003.

The fire was started in a supply room by a faulty light fixture and resulted in the deaths of six people. The City of Chicago, in addition to several other defendants, paid $100 million to the families of the six victims after litigation, citing multiple failures.

References

Government of Cook County, Illinois
Skyscraper office buildings in Chicago
1964 establishments in Illinois
Fazlur Khan buildings